The Miocene Arrow is a post-apocalyptic novel by Australian writer Sean McMullen. It is the middle book of the Greatwinter trilogy.

Plot summary
In isolated pockets of what used to be America, humans fight stylized duels in small, biodiesel-powered airplanes.  In a land where chivalry and honor are everything, what happens when rebels from Australia, enamored of the amazing technology held by the Americans, hatch a plot to bring some of it back to their homes?

Reception
Publishers Weekly  that "the tale features labyrinthine politics, a large cast of engaging, thorny and occasionally rather cartoonish characters, and many well depicted scenes of aerial warfare.  The authors inventive use of several oddball technologies is particularly noteworthy, and veteran SF readers may well be reminded of L. Sprague de Camp."

References

Sources

2000 Australian novels
Steampunk novels
Australian science fiction novels
2000 science fiction novels
Australian post-apocalyptic novels
Aurealis Award-winning works